is a Japanese fashion model, disc jockey, and businesswoman. She is best known for her stint as a model for the Koakuma Ageha cabaret-gyaru fashion magazine. She was a major contributor to Koakuma Ageha for 4 years and 10 months, since the magazine's very early days. She left Koakuma Ageha in 2011, and has since become a main model for its sister magazine Ane Ageha.

Career
Araki was born in Kyoto Prefecture, Japan. She lived in Kyoto until she moved to Tokyo to learn makeup art and nail art. She graduated from technical schools specialized in these arts, but entered nightwork at the age of 19 when she began working at a hostess bar.

Koakuma Ageha
She began fashion modeling at the age of 21 after being approached to model by Koakuma Ageha'''s editorial board in 2005 when she was a hostess at a Kabukicho hostess bar. Araki moved to Roppongi in 2006 and began working at Roppongi hostess bar R, under her new genji name "Riona Aihara". She had since worked for R by 2008 when she retired from the nightwork. Her "graduation from the night" was featured in Koakuma Ageha for the November 2008 issue.

Outside Koakuma Ageha
Araki started a professional career as a disc jockey under the stage name , releasing a CD in 2009 when she also launched her own fashion brand "GRS". She began performing at various night clubs all over Japan, and even made a collaboration with Tetsuya Komuro, at Avex's 2009 house music event House Nation Fiesta where the attendees included May J., Tomoyuki Tanaka, Yasutaka Nakata, Ami Suzuki, Shanadoo, Maynard Plant, among others.

She then established her own commercial building, "Girl's Factory Dot", in 2009 in Shibuya. "Girl's Factory Dot" launched as a 3-story building, where all the floors were dedicated to her own fashion brand GRS. She also released her first book, a photo-essay book , in 2009.

Araki left Koakuma Ageha with her last appearance in the March 2011 issue, moving to its sister magazine Ane Ageha.

Nightwork

Araki engaged in nightwork for about 4 years from the age of 19 through to 23.

At that time, the city was at the twilight of an era of "loan shark bubble". She rose to one of the highest-ranked hostesses within 2 or 3 months, and finally to the second-ranked one, at the bar where most customers were "overly-rich guys" involving in the illegal business. She began appearing in the Koakuma Ageha magazine at this time.

She rose to the top hostess at the bar and worked for the bar until she moved to Roppongi to work at R, a newly opened Roppongi hostess bar where she was hired as the "face". She had since worked at the Roppongi bar for two years.

Araki retired from the nightwork at the age of 23. Koakuma Ageha featured her retirement from the nightwork with its special editorial titled .

Notable appearances

MagazinesAne AgehaKoakuma Ageha, Oneh-san ni Natta!!! Koakuma Ageha×Happie Nuts×I Love Mama, 

Music videos
"Eternal", 
"Tasuki", 

Others
Video game: Yakuza 3, 
Runway: Shibuya Girls Collection '09 S/SRecord jacket: "Koakuma Heaven", 
Event: Sea Rize Rock 09×Nadesicollection09, 
Website: "Model Closet", 

Discography
, 
, 

References

External links
"Sayaka Araki Official Website", official website 
"Sayaka Araki Official Blog 'A Lucky'", official blog powered by Ameba Blog'' 

Japanese female models
Japanese DJs
People from Kyoto Prefecture
1984 births
Living people
Models from Kyoto Prefecture